David T. Barnard  (born 1951) is a Canadian computer scientist, academic, and, from 2008 to 2020, the 11th president and vice-Chancellor of the University of Manitoba. He was chair of Universities Canada.

He received a Bachelor of Science degree in 1973, a Master of Science degree in 1975 , and a Ph.D. in 1981 all in Computer Science from the University of Toronto. He started his academic career at Queen's University in 1977 eventually becoming a Professor in the Computing and Information Science Department. In 1996, he was appointed Vice-President (Administration) and Controller at the University of Regina. From 1998 to 2005, he was  President and Vice-Chancellor of the University of Regina. From 2005 to 2008, he was the COO and Chief Technology Officer of iQmetrix.

Barnard began serving a five year term as president and vice-chancellor of University of Manitoba in 2008. He was appointed to a second five year term in 2013 and his term was extended for two more years in 2016. His term ended on June 30, 2020.

Some of the institutions Barnard was and/or is currently a member of the Board of Directors of include the Bank of Canada (2005-2007), Saskatchewan Power Corporation (2000-2003), Saint Boniface Hospital (since 2008), NetSecure Technologies (since 2007), and Greystone Capital Management (since 2007). He is also a member of the Manitoba Electoral Divisions Boundaries Commission.

Honours
In 2018, he was made a member of the Order of Manitoba.

References

1951 births
Living people
Canadian university and college chief executives
Members of the Order of Manitoba
Academic staff of Queen's University at Kingston
Academic staff of the University of Manitoba
University of Toronto alumni